Todd Graves (born 1972) is an American entrepreneur and founder of Raising Cane's Chicken Fingers, a fast food restaurant company that specializes in fried chicken finger meals. Graves, along with Craig Silvey, founded the first restaurant in Baton Rouge, Louisiana in 1996.

Early life 
Graves was born in New Orleans and raised in Baton Rouge. Graves graduated from Episcopal High School in Baton Rouge, Louisiana.

Raising Cane's Chicken Fingers
Graves and long time friend Craig Silvey used Silvey's business plan course at LSU to create their business plan.

Graves opened Raising Cane's near the North Gates of Louisiana State University on Highland Road in 1996. By 2022 the company expanded to more than 600 restaurants in the U.S. and the Middle East.

The restaurants are named after Raising Cane I, Graves’ dog at the time of the founding of the first restaurant. They are headquartered in Baton Rouge.

Personal life
Graves and his wife, Gwen, have two children and reside in Baton Rouge, Louisiana with their yellow Labrador, Raising Cane III.

Collections

An avid collector, Graves has loaned a 66-million-year-old triceratops skull to the Louisiana Arts and Science Museum. He has also loaned the hearse that carried Martin Luther King, Jr. to exhibits across the country.

References

External links
 Raising Canes website

1972 births
Living people
Place of birth missing (living people)
American chief executives of food industry companies
American fishers
American food company founders
American boilermakers
Fast-food chain founders
Episcopal High School (Baton Rouge, Louisiana) alumni
People from Baton Rouge, Louisiana
People from Bristol Bay Borough, Alaska